Cocool is Norwegian singer Tone Damli's fourth studio album, which was released on 18 October 2010. The album peaked at number 22 on the Norwegian Albums Chart.

Track listing

Charts

Release history

References

2. Tone Damli Cocool

2010 albums
Tone Damli albums